Vietnam Journal was a war comic book series written and drawn by Don Lomax and published by Apple Comics from November 1987 to April 1991.

Plot 
The story follows Scott Neithammer, nicknamed "Journal" by the American soldiers, a freelance reporter in the Vietnam War obsessed with reporting from the point of view of the G.I., whatever the consequences.

Background 
Series creator Lomax was drafted in 1965 and served in Vietnam with the 98th Light Equipment Maintenance Company. During his tour of duty, he made notes and sketches which later were incorporated into Vietnam Journal.

Reprints 
The comic was later revived as a monthly full-page strip from 2002 to 2006 by Gallery magazine.

Vietnam Journal collections were re-issued by iBooks in 2004, and were nominated for a 2004 Harvey Award for Best Domestic Reprint Project.

The entire Vietnam Journal series was re-published in graphic novel form through Transfuzion Publishing in 2011 (and later republished by Caliber Comics in 2017–2019).

References

External links 
 Vietnam Journal by Don Lomax collected at the War Stories website including previews.

Comics set during the Vietnam War
War comics
1987 comics debuts
1991 comics endings